DSSP may refer to:

DSSP (hydrogen bond estimation algorithm), an algorithm that determines the secondary structure of protein subsequences from the coordinates of a protein structure
DSSP (imaging), a method of scanning objects into 3D digital representations
DSSP (programming), a programming language, acronym for Dialog System for Structured Programming
Decentralized Software Services Protocol, a SOAP-based protocol used by Microsoft Robotics Developer Studio
Deep Submergence Systems Project, US Navy program to develop methods of rescuing submarines
Dessert spoon, a spoon with a capacity of about 2 teaspoons
Digital Solid State Propulsion, American aerospace company